The 2016 European Cross Country Championships was the 23rd edition of the cross country running competition for European athletes. It was hosted in Chia, Italy.

Aras Kaya won the men's senior title, making it three straight victories for Turkey in that event, following in the footsteps of fellow Kenyan-Turkish runners Polat Kemboi Arıkan and Ali Kaya. Yasemin Can, became Turkey's first senior women's winner and also led her nation to the team title. Great Britain were the most successful in the team races, claiming the senior men's, under-23 women's and junior women's titles; the country reached the podium in all categories.

The 2016 edition saw increased Kenyan dominance at the competition, with the top two runners in both senior races being Kenyan-born, as well as the men's under-23 winner.

Race results

Senior men

Senior women

Under-23 men

Under-23 women

Junior men

Junior women

Medal table
Key

References

Results 
Senior Men. European Athletics. Retrieved 2017-01-02.
Senior Women. European Athletics. Retrieved 2017-01-02.
Under-20 Men. European Athletics. Retrieved 2017-01-02.
Under-20 Women. European Athletics. Retrieved 2017-01-02.
Under-23 Men. European Athletics. Retrieved 2017-01-02.
Under-23 Women. European Athletics. Retrieved 2017-01-02.

External links
Official website

European Cross Country Championships
December 2016 sports events in Europe
European Cross Country Championships
European Cross Country Championships
European Cross Country Championships
International athletics competitions hosted by Italy
Province of Cagliari
Sport in Sardinia
Cross country running in Italy